STK6 may refer to:
 Aurora A kinase, an enzyme
 Myosin-heavy-chain kinase, an enzyme